The Datsun brand automobile is owned and produced by Nissan. The name originated in 1931 when Dat Motorcar Company came out with a new smaller version of their original car. The company named this car "Datson", but when Nissan bought out the company they changed the name to "Datsun". Many types of this car were produced including the Fairlady, 240Z, and the 140Z.

Datsun 160Z (B210) (1978–1979)

Following the success of the Datsun 140Z, Nissan-Datsun South Africa announced the 160Z in July 1978 . The engine was upgraded to the L16 motor as per the 160U SSS, and fitted with high performance camshaft and twin Hitachi side-draught carburettors based on the British SU type carburettor. Although the engine put out 71 kW (less than the 85 kW of the 140Z) the car had more torque at 140 N.m (DIM) at 4,200 rpm against the 140Z’s 130 N.m (DIN) at 5,000 rpm. The brakes (MacPherson strut front suspension with disc brakes) were developed according to the 280L Series pattern of increased calliper and disc size, and both rear springs and shock absorbers were also enhanced to eliminate axle-tramp.

The 160Z colour scheme was based on the Datsun 280Z Zap car and came out in canary yellow with red, orange and yellow inlayed black decals, colour matched high back seats and Mexican stripe-cloth stitched in the centre panels. The 160Z also had front and rear spoilers; however, the front spoiler differed from the 140Z. Earlier models included a black rubber rear spoiler, whilst others had a colour matched yellow fibreglass rear spoiler – there is speculation as to whether Datsun-Nissan South Africa could no longer procure rubber spoilers or whether they felt the fibreglass spoiler was lighter and more durable than the rubber one.

The 160Z, as with the 140Z, had the DX/GL front grill (without integrated driving lights) with a ‘Datsun Z’ badge. Both the 160Z and 140Z had rear window louvres, manufactured by Perana Louvres South Africa. In addition, the 160Z had aluminium alloy wheels designed by Eddie Keizan of Tiger Wheels which were then later fitted to the 140Y and 160Y GX models, also part of the Y Series.

Nissan-Datsun South Africa produced 120 160Z’s in 1977 then retailing at ZAR 5,595, and 121 in 1979 retailing at ZAR 6,395 before being discontinued. By 1980 the final stock was being sold for ZAR 6,530

Specifications
Source:

Engine
Type:1.6 L 4 CYL OHC 1,595cm³, cast-iron block, alloy head, two valves per cylinder, single overhead cam
Bore & stroke: 83 x 73.7mm
Idling speed: 600r/min
Power (Max) DIN: 71 kW @5,800 r/min
Torque (Max) DIN: 140 N.m @ 4,200 r/min
Compression ratio: 9,0:1
Compression pressure: 1170 kPa
Oil pressure: 340/400 kPa
Firing order: 1,4,3,2 (No. 1 at front)
Radiator cap pressure: 88 kPa
Thermostat opening temp: 82 °C
Carburettor
Type: Twin Hitachi SU-type carburetor
Main jet: Needle
Transmission
Clutch type: Diaphragm
Gearbox: 4 speed manual
Rear axle: Semi-floating
Final drive: 4,11:1
Speed in top gear per 1,000 r/min: 27.2 km/h
Suspension
Front: MacPherson strut
Rear: Semi-elliptic leaf
Steering
Type: Recirculating ball
Turning circle: 9.6mm
Tyres and wheels
Sizes: 165 x 13 Radial
Rim size: 5.5J
Tyre pressures: 
 Front: 190 kPa
 Rear: 190 kPa
Dimensions
Wheelbase: 2,340 mm (92.13 in) 
Length: 4,045 mm (159.25 in) 
Width: 1,545 mm (60.83 in) 
Height: 1,370 mm (53.94 in)
Weight: 970 kg (2,138.48 lb)
Brakes
Type:
Front: Disks
Rear: Drums
Dia: 
Front: 212.5 mm
Rear: 203.2 mm
Servo assisted: Yes 
Capacities
Sump: 4.2L
Gearbox: 1.7L
Final drive: 0.8L
Radiator: 7.0L
Fuel tank: 43L

Sources

 Imagery courtesy of E Gerber of www.160z.co.za.

See also
 Nissan Sunny B210
Nissan L engine
Nissan Z-car

160Z
Cars of South Africa